This is a list of German television related events from 1973.

Events
21 February - Gitte is selected to represent Germany at the 1973 Eurovision Song Contest with her song "Junger Tag". She is selected to be the eighteenth German Eurovision entry during Ein Lied für Luxemburg held at the HR Studios in Frankfurt.

Debuts

ARD
 15 January – Ein Herz und eine Seele (1973–1976)
 17 January – Unter Ausschluß der Öffentlichkeit (1973)
 23 January – Lawinenpatrouille (1973)
 2 April – Lemmi und die Schmöker (1973–1983)
 4 April – Frühbesprechung (1973)
 23 April –  (1973)
 4 May – Neues vom Kleinstadtbahnhof (1973)
 24 July – Klimbim (1973–1979)
 August – Ein Fall für Männdli (1973–1975)
 21 September – Die Kriminalerzählung (1973)

ZDF
 1 January – Die merkwürdige Lebensgeschichte des Friedrich Freiherrn von der Trenck (1973)
 7 January – Peter ist der Boß (1973)
 18 January – Drei Partner (1973)
 8 April – Hallo - Hotel Sacher... Portier! (1973–1974)
 17 April – Lokaltermin (1973)
 19 April – Sechs unter Millionen (1973)
 2 July – Der Bastian (1973)
 18 July – Polizeistation (1973)
 24 July – Der Nervtöter (1973)
 1 October – Alles Gute, Köhler (1973)
 17 October – Mordkommission (1973–1975)
 8 November – Zwischen den Flügen (1973)

DFF
 16 September – Eva und Adam  (1973)
 11 November – Stülpner-Legende (1973)
 23 December –  Das unsichtbare Visier (1973–1979)
 25 December –  Clown Ferdinand (1973–1975)

International
8 January -  Sesame Street (1969-present)

Television shows

1950s
Tagesschau (1952–present)

1960s
 heute (1963-present)

1970s

 Disco (1971-1982)
 Musikladen (1972-1984)

Ending this year

Births

Deaths